Manik Lal Samaddar is a Bangladeshi civil servant and former special assistant to the Chief Advisor of the Caretaker government with the rank of a cabinet minister responsible for two ministries.

History
Samaddar was a former secretary of the Government of Bangladesh. On 22 January 2008, Jamil was appointed Special Assistant to Chief Advisor of the Caretaker government, Fakhruddin Ahmed, with the rank of a Minister. He was placed in charge of the Ministry of Fisheries and Livestock and the Ministry of Information and Communication Technology.

References

Advisors of Caretaker Government of Bangladesh
Living people
Year of birth missing (living people)
Fisheries and Livestock ministers of Bangladesh
Posts, Telecommunications and Information Technology ministers